Finbarr Cullen was a Gaelic footballer from County Offaly, Ireland. He played with the Offaly intercounty team from 1991 to 2000. He was captain of the Offaly team that won the Leinster Senior Football Championship in 1997 and the National Football League in 1998. He was also a noted hurler winning Leinster and All-Ireland Minor Hurling Championships in 1989. 

He played at club level with Edenderry winning Offaly Senior Football Championships in 1995, 1997, 1999 and 2001.

References
 http://hoganstand.com/offaly/ArticleForm.aspx?ID=60954
 http://hoganstand.com/offaly/ArticleForm.aspx?ID=24607

Living people
Edenderry Gaelic footballers
Offaly inter-county Gaelic footballers
Offaly inter-county hurlers
Edenderry hurlers
Year of birth missing (living people)